The Sor Juana Inés de la Cruz Recognition is an award given since 2003 by the National Autonomous University of Mexico (UNAM). It is presented to women of the institution for achievements in "teaching, research, or the dissemination of culture." Consisting of a medal and a diploma with the image of Sor Juana Inés de la Cruz, it is awarded annually in conjunction with International Women's Day.

The technical or internal council of each Baccalaureate school, faculty, research institute, etc. submits nominations of outstanding university students to the UNAM general secretariat.

The requirements to receive the medal include having a definitive academic appointment at UNAM, not having received the award previously, excelling in the proposed fields, and being nominated by a technical or internal council.

List of ceremonies

References

2003 establishments in Mexico
Awards established in 2003
Awards honoring women
Mexican awards
National Autonomous University of Mexico